The illegal drug trade in Panama includes trans-shipment of cocaine to the United States. The 1989 United States invasion of Panama to topple Dictator Manuel Noriega was justified in part by the need to combat drug trafficking. Noriega, the dictator of Panama from 1983 to 1989, had a relationship with the U.S. Central Intelligence Agency (CIA) from the 1950s. More recently, Mexican cartels such as the Sinaloa Cartel have been active in Panama.

Manuel Noriega

Although the relationship did not become contractual until 1967, Noriega worked with the U.S. Central Intelligence Agency (CIA) from the late 1950s until the 1980s. In 1988 the U.S. Drug Enforcement Administration indicted him on federal drug charges.

The 1988 Senate Subcommittee on Terrorism, Narcotics and International Operations concluded that "The saga of Panama's General Manuel Antonio Noriega represents one of the most serious foreign policy failures for the United States. Throughout the 1970s and the 1980s, Noriega was able to manipulate U.S. policy toward his country, while skillfully accumulating near-absolute power in Panama. It is clear that each U.S. government agency which had a relationship with Noriega turned a blind eye to his corruption and drug dealing, even as he was emerging as a key player on behalf of the Medellín Cartel (a member of which was notorious Colombian drug lord Pablo Escobar)." Noriega was allowed to establish "the hemisphere's first 'narcokleptocracy'".

One of the large financial institutions that he was able to use to launder money was the Bank of Credit and Commerce International (BCCI) which was shut down at the end of the Cold War by the FBI.  Noriega shared his cell with ex-BCCI executives in the facility that is known as "Club Med".

As a result of the 1989 invasion of Panama by the United States, Manuel Noriega was removed from power, captured, detained as a prisoner of war, and flown to the United States. Noriega was tried on eight counts of drug trafficking, racketeering, and money laundering in April 1992. Noriega's U.S. prison sentence ended in September 2007; pending the outcome of extradition requests by both Panama and France, for convictions in absentia for murder in 1995 and money laundering in 1999, respectively. France was granted its extradition request in April 2010. He arrived in Paris on April 27, 2010, and after a re-trial as a condition of the extradition, he was found guilty and sentenced to seven years in jail in July 2010.

See also 
 Crime in Panama

References

Panama
Crime in Panama by type
Drugs in Panama
Panama
Panama